United Nations Security Council resolution 587, adopted on 23 September 1986, after recalling previous resolutions on the topic, the council strongly condemned attacks on the United Nations Interim Force in Lebanon (UNIFIL) in southern Lebanon, expressing indignation at support the attacks receive. Several people died in the attack, in which UNIFIL blamed the Israeli-backed South Lebanon Army for perpetrating.

The resolution, tabled by France, commended the work of UNIFIL and its "courage, spirit of discipline and composure". It also took note of a report by the Secretary-General and accepted his proposals relating to the security of the Force, requesting him to report back within 21 days on the implementation of Resolution 587.

The Council ended by demanding the withdrawal of all military forces not accepted by the Lebanese authorities from southern Lebanon.

Resolution 587 was adopted with 14 votes to none, while the United States abstained from voting.

See also 
 Israeli–Lebanese conflict
 Lebanese Civil War
 List of United Nations Security Council Resolutions 501 to 600 (1982–1987)
 South Lebanon conflict (1982–2000)

References

External links
 
Text of the Resolution at undocs.org

 0587
 0587
Israeli–Lebanese conflict
1986 in Israel
1986 in Lebanon
 0587
September 1986 events